A hemoglobinometer or haemoglobinometer (British English) is a medical device used to measure hemoglobin concentration in blood. It can operate by spectrophotometric measurement of hemoglobin concentration. Portable hemoglobinometers provide easy and convenient measurement of hematological variables, especially in areas where clinic laboratories are unavailable.

As per guidelines of National AIDS Control Organisation (NACO) for accurate results & mass screening, analysis using hemoglobinometer is a recommended method used for absorbance measurement of whole blood at Hb/HbO2/Isobestic point, based on microcuvette technology such as HemoCue 301 and Mokshit-Chanda-AM005A.

See also
Hemocytometer
Cytometry
Glucose meter
Blood chemistry

References

Physiological instruments
Hematology